The 1956 New Hampshire Wildcats baseball team represented the University of New Hampshire in the 1956 NCAA baseball season. The Wildcats played their home games at Brackett Field. The team was coached by Hank Swasey in his 11th year as head coach at New Hampshire.

The Wildcats won the District I to advance to the College World Series, where they were defeated by the Arizona Wildcats.

Roster

Schedule

! style="" | Regular Season
|- valign="top" 

|- bgcolor="#ffcccc"
| 1 || April 25 || at  || Unknown • Brunswick, Maine || 1–5 || 0–1 || –
|- bgcolor="#ccffcc"
| 2 || April 27 ||  || Brackett Field • Durham, New Hampshire || 6–1 || 1–1 || 1–0
|-

|- bgcolor="#ccffcc"
| 3 || May 1 ||  || Unknown • Orono, Maine || 3–2 || 2–1 || 2–0
|- bgcolor="#ccffcc"
| 4 || May 4 ||  || Brackett Field • Durham, New Hampshire || 8–1 || 3–1 || 2–0
|- bgcolor="#ccffcc"
| 5 || May 5 || Lowell Tech || Brackett Field • Durham, New Hampshire || 11–5 || 4–1 || 2–0
|- bgcolor="#ffcccc"
| 6 || May 7 ||  || Brackett Field • Durham, New Hampshire || 2–8 || 4–2 || 2–0
|- bgcolor="#ffcccc"
| 7 || May 11 ||  || Brackett Field • Durham, New Hampshire || 0–2 || 4–3 || 2–1
|- bgcolor="#ccffcc"
| 8 || May 11 || UMass || Brackett Field • Durham, New Hampshire || 5–3 || 5–3 || 3–1
|- bgcolor="#ccffcc"
| 9 || May 12 ||  || Brackett Field • Durham, New Hampshire || 7–3 || 6–3 || 4–1
|- bgcolor="#ccffcc"
| 10 || May 12 || Connecticut || Brackett Field • Durham, New Hampshire|| 6–5 || 7–3 || 5–1
|- bgcolor="#ffcccc"
| 11 || May  ||  || Brackett Field • Durham, New Hampshire || 3–10 || 7–4 || 5–1
|- bgcolor="#ccffcc"
| 12 || May 18 || Rhode Island || Unknown • Kingston, Rhode Island || 4–0 || 8–4 || 6–1
|- bgcolor="#ffcccc"
| 13 || May 19 ||  || Unknown • Amherst, Massachusetts || 9–11 || 8–5 || 6–1
|- bgcolor="#ccffcc"
| 14 || May 23 || at  || Brackett Field • Durham, New Hampshire || 12–6 || 9–5 || 6–1
|- bgcolor="#ccffcc"
| 15 || May 26 || Maine || Brackett Field • Durham, New Hampshire || – || 10–5 || 7–1
|-

|-
! style="" | Postseason
|- valign="top" 

|- bgcolor="#ccffcc"
| 16 || May  || vs Boston University || Pynchon Park • Springfield, Massachusetts || 5–0 || 11–5 || 7–1
|- bgcolor="#ccffcc"
| 17 || May || vs  || Pynchon Park • Springfield, Massachusetts || 2–0 || 12–5 || 7–1
|-

|- bgcolor="#ffcccc"
| 18 || June 9 || vs Ole Miss || Omaha Municipal Stadium • Omaha, Nebraska || 12–13 || 12–6 || 7–1
|- bgcolor="#ccffcc"
| 19 || June 10 || vs Washington State || Omaha Municipal Stadium • Omaha, Nebraska || 6–3 || 13–6 || 7–1
|- bgcolor="#ffcccc"
| 20 || June 11 || vs Arizona || Omaha Municipal Stadium • Omaha, Nebraska || 1–0 || 13–7 || 7–1
|-

References

New Hampshire Wildcats baseball seasons
New Hampshire Wildcats baseball
College World Series seasons
New Hampshire
Yankee Conference baseball champion seasons